Clementine Creevy (born December 11, 1996) is an American singer-songwriter, musician, actor and model. She is best known as a founding member of the rock band Cherry Glazerr and for her role as Margaux in the TV series Transparent.

Career

Early life
Clementine Creevy was born on December 11, 1996 in Los Angeles. Her mother is a novelist. Her father is the American TV writer and producer Nicholas Wootton.

Music
Clementine Creevy started her musical career as a high school student with the solo project Clembutt in 2012, uploading a number of tracks onto SoundCloud. The tracks were discovered by Sean Bohrman at Burger Records who released the tracks in 2013 under the title Papa Cremp. In 2013, Creevy formed the band Cherry Glazerr. The band have released three albums including Haxel Princess, Apocalipstick and Stuffed & Ready.

In 2017, VICE magazine produced a short autobiographical documentary about Creevy titled Clementine Creevy: The Millenial [sic] Punk Feminist Icon. Creevy is featured on Tyler, The Creator's album Cherry Bomb, on the song "Okaga, CA", and supplied guest vocals for the Death Grips song "Giving Bad People Good Ideas", on the album Bottomless Pit.

Acting
From 2014 to 2015, Creevy appeared as the recurring character Margaux in the TV series Transparent. In the series, her character leads the fictional rock band Glitterish.

Modeling
Creevy has modelled for the Australian designer Emma Mulholland.

Personal life
In an Instagram post in July 2020, Creevy accused former Cherry Glazerr bandmate, and bassist of The Buttertones, Sean Redman of statutory rape. In response, Innovative Leisure, the record label for The Buttertones, announced they would be dropping the band immediately.

References

1996 births
21st-century American women singers
21st-century American singers
American women guitarists
American women singer-songwriters
American indie rock musicians
Living people
Musicians from Los Angeles
Guitarists from California
Singer-songwriters from California